The FIDE World Cup refers to three different events over the years. Since 2000, it has been a major chess event organized by FIDE, the International Chess Federation. Since 2005, it has been a 128-player single-elimination chess tournament, forming part of the qualification for the World Chess Championship.

GMA World Cup (1988–1989)

In 1988–1989, the Grandmasters Association organised a series of six high-ranking World Cup tournaments in the form of a 'Grand Prix'.

FIDE World Cup (2000–2002)

In 2000 and 2002 FIDE, the International Chess Federation, staged their "First Chess World Cup" and "Second Chess World Cup" respectively. These were major tournaments, but not directly linked to the World Chess Championship. Both the 2000 and 2002 events were won by Viswanathan Anand of India.

Winners

Both tournaments began with a round-robin stage, consisting of four groups of six players each. The top two players from each group were subsequently seeded into an eight-player single-elimination bracket.

FIDE World Cup (2005–present) 

Since 2005, a different event of the same name has been part of the World Chess Championship cycle. This event is being held every two years. It is a 128-player knockout tournament, in the same style as the Tilburg tournament between 1992 and 1994, or the 1998, 1999, 2000, 2002 and 2004 FIDE World Championships.

The event was held in 2005, 2007, 2009, and 2011 in Khanty-Mansiysk, and subsequently FIDE has given preference to bids for the Olympiad that also contain a bid for the preceding World Cup. During the 2015 finals of the World Cup, the main organizer commented "We received the right to host the Olympiad and then we were given an additional event – the World Cup."

The Chess World Cup 2005 qualified ten players for the Candidates Tournament for the World Chess Championship 2007. Since then, every World Cup has qualified between one and three players for the Candidates Tournament.

Two World Cup qualifiers (Boris Gelfand in 2009 and Sergey Karjakin in 2015) won the subsequent Candidates tournament and played in the World Championship match, in 2012 and 2016 respectively.

Format
Since 2005, the format has been 128 players with 7 single-elimination rounds of "mini-matches", which are 2 games each followed by a series of rapid then blitz tiebreaks if necessary. The final usually has 4 games before the tiebreaks start. Since 2015, an extra rest day has recently been added before the semi-finals, in addition to before the final.

Some criticism has been leveled at the scheduling effects, with the event being rather long (26 days), particularly with almost all of the players having left long before the end. Fatigue thus plays a critical role, and while some players seek to conserve energy by avoiding tiebreaks, others "agree" (either explicitly or implicitly) to make short draws in the 2 long games and decide the winner in tiebreaks. It is often remarked that the system is mostly a lottery of who survives, though better players have more chances on the whole. The anticlimax of the 4-round final, with both players now already qualified for the Candidates, has also been criticized.

Winners
"Qual" refers to the number of players who qualify for the Candidates Tournament (marked with green background). For example, in 2015, the top 2 finishers qualified for the 2016 Candidates Tournament.

All tournaments since 2005 were played in single-elimination format, as seen in the format section above.

See also
Women's World Chess Championship, held approximately every other year, played with a similar format (knockout), but only 64 players.
FIDE Grand Prix, another way to qualify for the Candidates Tournament

References

 
Chess competitions